Steve Rouiller (born 10 July 1990) is a Swiss footballer who plays for Servette FC.

Club career

FC Sion
Rouiller started his senior career with FC Sion in the Swiss Super League. He made his league debut for the club on 25 October 2014 in a 1-1 away draw with Basel.

Monthey
In July 2011, Rouiller moved to FC Monthey in the Swiss 1. Liga. He spent three years with the club, racking up over sixty league appearances and scoring seven goals.

Chiasso
In February 2016, Rouiller moved to Chiasso on a year-and-a-half deal. He made his league debut for the club on 28 March 2015 in a 2-0 home defeat to Biel-Bienne. He scored his first competitive goal for the club on 19 October 2015 in a 1-1 away draw, also with Biel-Benne. His goal, scored in the 15th minute, made the score 1-0 to Chiasso.

Lugano
In August 2016, Rouiller moved to FC Lugano on a one-year contract with an option to extend for another year. He made his league debut for the club on 16 October 2016 in a 0-0 home draw with BSC Young Boys. He scored his first league goal for the club on 9 August 2017 in a 3-2 away victory over Lausanne. His goal, scored in the 53rd minute, made the score 2-1 to Lugano.

Servette
In June 2018, Rouiller joined Challenge League club Servette. He made his league debut for the club on 21 July 2018 in a 2-0 away victory over Aarau.

References

External links
Profile at Swiss Football League website

Swiss men's footballers
Swiss Super League players
1990 births
Living people
FC Sion players
FC Chiasso players
FC Lugano players
Servette FC players
Swiss Challenge League players
Association football defenders